The 1898 Minnesota Senate election was held in the U.S. state of Minnesota on November 8, 1898, to elect members to the Senate of the 31st and 32nd Minnesota Legislatures.

On the coattails of Democrat John Lind's gubernatorial campaign, the Minnesota Democratic Party saw a minor resurgence in the Senate. The Party consolidated much of the third party support that had become a large factor in the elections of 1890 and 1894. The People's Party endorsed a handful of Democratic candidates that ended up winning and caucusing as Democrats in the Senate.

The Minnesota Republican Party won a large majority of seats followed by the Minnesota Democratic Party. The new Legislature convened on January 3, 1899.

Two independent candidates won election to the Senate, one of whom caucused with Democrats upon being seated. In the 48th District, two Republicans ran against one another, and the winner was the one who had not been endorsed by the Party. Both candidates are listed as Republicans in the vote aggregate.

Results 

*These totals count candidates endorsed by the Democratic and People's Parties in the totals for the Democratic Party.

See also 

 Minnesota gubernatorial election, 1898

References 

1898 Minnesota elections
Minnesota
Minnesota Senate elections